The Phryni were an ancient people of eastern Central Asia, probably located in the eastern part of the Tarim Basin, in an area connected to that of the Seres and the Tocharians.

They are mentioned several times in Classical sources. 

Strabo, speaking of the Greco-Bactrian kingdom explains that "they extended their empire even as far as the Seres and the Phryni". 

Later, Pliny the Elder includes the Phryni (whom he names "Phruri") in his description of the people of the Far East:

References

Bactrian and Indian Hellenistic period
Ancient peoples of China
Tocharians